Anaxarcha tianmushanensis is a species of praying mantis found in China.

See also
List of mantis genera and species

References

T
Mantodea of Asia
Endemic fauna of China
Insects of China
Insects described in 1985